The 2002–03 season was the 104th season of competitive league football in the history of English football club Wolverhampton Wanderers. They played the season in the second tier of the English football system, the Football League First Division.

The season was a huge success for the club as they were promoted to the Premier League via the play-offs after finishing fifth in the table. It was their first and only success in the play-off system from, to date, six attempts. This ended a nineteen-year top flight absence for the club and a fourteen-year stay in the same division.

Season review

In contrast to the heavy spending of the previous close season, Summer 2002 saw the club recruit four players on free transfers. Two of these incoming players were however high-profile deals, with former England captain Paul Ince signing alongside ex-Manchester United stalwart Denis Irwin, on one-year deals.

The season began strongly with an opening day draw at administration-hit Bradford City, followed by three successive victories that put the club at the top of the table. Their form soon dipped though, and the next seven games brought just one win. An upturn saw a 10-game unbeaten run return the team to the play-off positions, aided by the loan addition of striker Carlton Cole. The Christmas/New Year period though brought a return of just two points from a possible 15.

With this drop in form, manager Dave Jones faced criticism from chairman Sir Jack Hayward at the turn of the year, publicly reminding him that he had promised to deliver automatic promotion. With the club lying 10th in the league, some 16 points from the top two, the FA Cup provided a welcome distraction as the team entered their best performance of the campaign to eliminate Premier League high flyers Newcastle United in a thrilling televised tie.

The following week brought a first league success in six games, with a narrow victory at neighbours Walsall further relieving the pressure on manager Jones. A 4–1 cup triumph against promotion chasers Leicester City preceded the team's highest away win of the campaign, where they defeated Sheffield Wednesday 4–0 to return to the play-off zone. However, their following away fixture brought the team crashing back to ground with a 1–4 loss at relegation strugglers Brighton.

An unbeaten sequence yielded 14 points from 18 before a slender loss at runaway leaders Portsmouth. March also saw an exit from the FA Cup, losing 0–2 at Premier League Southampton in Wolves' first quarter final appearance for five years, before the club recorded their biggest win since 1988 as they thumped Gillingham 6–0.

By April Wolves sat in sixth place, the final play-off berth, but with the East Anglian duo of Ipswich and Norwich just two points behind. Easter Monday brought the decisive round of games to clarify the play-off picture with Ipswich losing earlier in the day, meaning Wolves could confirm their play-off place if they won at Norwich. A 3–0 victory that evening ensured the club would participate in its fourth play-off campaign at this level.

Wolves finished the season in fifth place after two successive draws, meaning they would play Reading in the play-offs. The first leg saw them at home, where they overturned a half time deficit to win the game 2–1 and take a lead into the second leg. A tense 1–0 success at the Madejski Stadium thanks to a goal from substitute Alex Rae sent them into the final for the first time, breaking a run of three successive losses in away legs.

The final was staged at the Millennium Stadium in Cardiff where Wolves met Sheffield United. The Blades had had a strong season, being positioned in the play-off zone almost throughout and reaching the semi finals of both the FA Cup and League Cup. Wolves won the game decisively with three first-half goals by Mark Kennedy, Nathan Blake and top goalscorer Kenny Miller bringing a 3–0 triumph, preserved by goalkeeper Matt Murray who saved a second half penalty from Michael Brown as part of a man of the match performance.

Promotion ended a 19-year absence from the top level of English football for the club and a fourteen-year stay in the same division. It also brought owner Sir Jack Hayward his dream of Premier League football at his 13th attempt. Three days later Hayward joined in a bus parade through Wolverhampton city centre to Molineux to celebrate the triumph.

Results

Pre season
Wolves' pre season saw them spend a week in Cascais, Portugal (15–22 July), training and playing two Portuguese sides. As had become common in recent years, only their final game was held at their Molineux home. 

A second string Wolves side also played: 2–0 v Kidderminster Harriers (24 July), 4–0 v Worcester City (1 August) and 0–0 v Burton Albion (6 August)

Football League First Division

A total of 24 teams competed in the Football League First Division in the 2002–03 season. Each team played every other team twice: once at their stadium, and once at the opposition's. Three points were awarded to teams for each win, one point per draw, and none for defeats.

The provisional fixture list was released on 13 June 2002, but was subject to change in the event of matches being selected for television coverage or police concerns.

Final table

Results summary

Results by round

Play-offs

FA Cup

League Cup

Players

Statistics

|-
|align="left"|||align="left"|||align="left"| 
|||0||0||0||1||0||0||0||||0||0||0||
|-
|align="left"|||align="left"|||align="left"|  †
|0||0||0||0||0||0||0||0||0||0||0||0||
|-
|align="left"|||align="left"|||align="left"| 
|||||||0||||0||3||1||||||1||0||
|-
|align="left"|||align="left"|||align="left"| 
|||||||0||||2||||1||||||9||0||
|-
|align="left"|||align="left"|||align="left"| 
|44||0||||0||||0||3||0||52||0||1||0||
|-
|align="left"|||align="left"|||align="left"| 
|||0||||0||||0||3||0||||0||10||0||
|-
|align="left"|||align="left"|||align="left"| 
|||||||0||||1||||0||||||5||0||
|-
|align="left"|||align="left"|||align="left"|  
|43||||||0||||0||3||0||style="background:#98FB98"|||||6||0||
|-
|align="left"|||align="left"|FW||align="left"| 
|||12||||0||||1||3||1||||14||6||1||
|-
|align="left"|10||align="left"|||align="left"| 
|||||||0||0||0||3||0||||||3||0||
|-
|align="left"|11||align="left"|||align="left"| 
|||||||1||0||0||3||1||||||4||0||
|-
|align="left"|12||align="left"|FW||align="left"|  ¤
|||||||1||||0||||0||||||1||0||
|-
|align="left"|13||align="left"|||align="left"| 
|40||0||||0||||0||3||0||style="background:#98FB98"|48||0||0||0||
|-
|align="left"|14||align="left"|||align="left"|  ¤
|||0||0||0||||1||||0||||||1||0||
|-
|align="left"|15||align="left"|||align="left"| 
|||||||0||0||0||||0||||||5||0||
|-
|align="left"|16||align="left"|FW||align="left"| 
|||19||||3||||1||3||1||||24||5||0||
|-
|align="left"|17||align="left"|||align="left"| 
|0||0||0||0||0||0||0||0||0||0||0||0||
|-
|align="left"|18||align="left"|FW||align="left"|  
|||||||4||||0||1||0||||11||7||0||
|-
|align="left"|19||align="left"|||align="left"| 
|||0||||0||0||0||0||0||||0||1||0||
|-
|align="left"|20||align="left"|FW||align="left"|  ¤
|0||0||0||0||0||0||0||0||0||0||0||0||
|-
|align="left"|21||align="left"|||align="left"|  ¤
|||||0||0||||0||0||0||style="background:#98FB98"|||||2||0||
|-
|align="left"|23||align="left"|||align="left"|  (c)
|||||||1||||0||3||0||style="background:#98FB98"|||||13||0||
|-
|align="left"|24||align="left"|||align="left"|  
|||0||0||0||||0||0||0||style="background:#98FB98"|||0||3||0||
|-
|align="left"|29||align="left"|FW||align="left"| 
|||10||||0||||0||||0||||10||4||0||
|-
|align="left"|30||align="left"|||align="left"|  † 
|0||0||0||0||0||0||0||0||0||0||0||0||
|-
|align="left"|31||align="left"|||align="left"|  ¤
|||0||||0||0||0||0||0||style="background:#98FB98"|||0||1||0||
|-
|align="left"|32||align="left"|||align="left"|  ¤ 
|||0||0||0||0||0||0||0||style="background:#98FB98"|||0||0||0||
|-
|align="left"|33||align="left"|||align="left"| 
|0||0||0||0||0||0||0||0||0||0||0||0||
|-
|align="left"|34||align="left"|||align="left"| 
|0||0||0||0||0||0||0||0||0||0||0||0||
|-
|align="left"|35||align="left"|||align="left"|  ¤
|0||0||0||0||0||0||0||0||0||0||0||0||
|-
|align="left"|36||align="left"|||align="left"|  †
|0||0||0||0||0||0||0||0||0||0||0||0||
|-
|align="left"|37||align="left"|||align="left"| 
|0||0||0||0||0||0||0||0||0||0||0||0||
|-
|align="left"|39||align="left"|FW||style="background:#faecc8" align="left"|  ‡
|||||0||0||0||0||0||0||style="background:#98FB98"|||||0||0||
|}

Awards

Transfers

In

Out

Loans in

Loans out

Kit
The season saw new home and away kits, manufactured by Admiral. The home strip reverted to a lighter gold colour after two years wearing a darker "old gold" style, while the away kit returned to the club's traditional all-white look. After twelve seasons sponsored by Goodyear, the club signed a two-year deal with Doritos.

References

Wolverhampton Wanderers F.C. seasons
Wolverhampton Wanderers